Stephen Herbert Heinze (born January 30, 1970) is an American former National Hockey League right winger. He played for the Boston Bruins, Columbus Blue Jackets, Buffalo Sabres, and Los Angeles Kings between 1992 and 2003. He was drafted in the third round, 60th overall, by the Boston Bruins in the 1988 NHL Entry Draft. Internationally Heinze played for the American national team at the 1992 Winter Olympics and the 2000 World Championships. Heinze was born in Lawrence, Massachusetts, but grew up in North Andover, Massachusetts.

Playing career
Heinze played three seasons for Boston College earning All Hockey East Rookie Team, All Hockey East Team, All Hockey East Tournament Team, All New England and All American honors. He was inducted into the Boston College Hall of Fame in 2010. Heinze went on to play for the 1992 U.S. Olympic hockey team in Albertville, France. In March of that year, following the Olympic Games, he signed a multiyear contract with the Boston Bruins. After nine seasons with the Bruins, he joined the Columbus Blue Jackets for the 2000–01 season. The Blue Jackets traded him to the Buffalo Sabres at that season's trade deadline.  He then joined the Los Angeles Kings as a free agent before the 2001–02 season, and played the final two seasons of his career there.

Because of his last name, Heinze requested to wear #57 (as in Heinz 57 ketchup) with the Bruins. However, the Bruins general manager Harry Sinden denied his request, stating that only Ray Bourque (#77) could wear an unorthodox number. Instead, Heinze wore #23 in Boston. He was granted #57 when he joined the Blue Jackets and he wore it for the remainder of his NHL career.

In his NHL career, Heinze appeared in 694 games. He scored 178 goals and added 158 assists. He also appeared in 69 NHL playoff games, scoring 11 goals and adding 15 assists.

Career statistics

Regular season and playoffs

International

Awards and honors

References

External links
 

1970 births
Living people
American men's ice hockey right wingers
Boston Bruins draft picks
Boston Bruins players
Boston College Eagles men's ice hockey players
Buffalo Sabres players
Columbus Blue Jackets players
Ice hockey players from Massachusetts
Ice hockey players at the 1992 Winter Olympics
Los Angeles Kings players
Manchester Monarchs (AHL) players
Olympic ice hockey players of the United States
Sportspeople from Lawrence, Massachusetts
AHCA Division I men's ice hockey All-Americans